Kateřina Elhotová (born 14 October 1989) is a Czech basketball player currently playing for USK Praha of the Czech Women's Basketball League.

Career
Elhotova joined USK Praha in 2007. She was part of the 2013-14 Prague team who went the entire season unbeaten (41 wins) and the team that won the Euroleague in 2015. She won the FIBA Europe SuperCup with Praha, scoring 32 points against Castors Braine and, in the final against UMMC Ekaterinburg, 16 points, 3 rebounds, 2 assists and one steal. She was named MVP of the tournament.

Elhotova was signed by the Minnesota Lynx of the WNBA on 25 February 2016

International
Elhotova made her international debut at the 2004 European Under-16 Championship. In 2007, she played at the FIBA Under-19 World Championship for Women and Eurobasket. She has played for the Czech Republic at Eurobasket 2007 through to 2015. She played at the World Championships in 2010, (winning the silver medal) and 2014 and at the 2008 and 2012 Summer Olympics, both times reaching the tournament's quarter finals.

References

External links
Katerina Elhotova at FIBAEurope.com

1989 births
Living people
Basketball players at the 2008 Summer Olympics
Basketball players at the 2012 Summer Olympics
Czech women's basketball players
Olympic basketball players of the Czech Republic
Small forwards
Sportspeople from Prague